Cetopsidium minutum is a species of whale catfish found in Brazil, French Guiana, Guyana, Suriname and Venezuela where it occurs in the coastal rivers north of the Amazon to the Orinoco River.

References 

 

Cetopsidae
Fish of South America
Fish of Brazil
Fish of French Guiana
Fish of Guyana
Fish of Suriname
Fish of Venezuela
Fish described in 1912